Coronin-6 also known as coronin-like protein E (Clipin-E) is a protein that in humans is encoded by the CORO6 gene.

Coronin-6  belongs to the coronin family which is an actin binding protein. Human CORO6 gene is located on chromosome 17 on the cytogenetic band 17 p11.2. Gene CORO6 is well conserved across domain of eukaryotic organisms from animal to fungi.

Expression

EST profile
Based on the EST profile, CORO6 expressed in high level at the larynx, nerve and muscle. CORO6 has also been shown to be expressed in high levels in the breast (mammary gland) tumor. During the human development stage, the higher level of CORO6 expressed at blastocyst and adult.

Transcript Variant 
Alternative mRNAs are shown aligned from 5' to 3' on a virtual genome where introns have been shrunk to a minimal length. Exon size is proportional to length, intron height reflects the number of cDNAs supporting each intron. Introns of the same color are identical, of different colors are different. 'Good proteins' are pink, partial or not-good proteins are yellow, uORFs are green. 5' cap or3' poly A flags show completeness of the transcript .  CORO6 contains 21 distinct gt-ag introns. Transcription produces 10 alternatively spliced mRNA. There are 3 probable alternative promoters, and validated alternative polyadenylation sites.

Structure 
CORO6 protein sequence contains WD-40 repeats.  WD40 domain is a structural motif found in Eukaryotes and cover variety of functions, such as adaptor or regulatory modules in signal transduction, pre-mRNA processing and cytoskeletal assembly.  It usually terminating at WD dipeptide at its C-terminus and is about 40 residues long, so called WD40.

The structure of CORO6 is predicted by using Phyre2 program. It is similar to the crystal structure of murine coronin-1. 390 residues ( 83% of CORO6 protein sequence) have been modelled with 100.0% confidence by the single highest scoring template. Image coloured by rainbow N → C terminus

Homology

Paralogs 
Human proteins which are the paralogs to CORO6,
CORO1A,
CORO1B,
CORO1C,
CORO2A,
CORO2B,
CORO7

The table compared Homo sapiens protein CORO6 to its paralogs

By comparing its paralogs we found that CORO1A and CORO1B are most related to CORO6.

Orthologs 
CORO6 is highly conserved throughout the organisms from vertebrate to fungus, the organisms listed in the table are some representatives.

Clinical significance 
There are several clinical studies about that have been performed by using microarray indicating that CORO6 is positively related to allergic nasal epithelium response to house dust mite allergen in vitro.

Model organisms
Model organisms have been used in the study of CORO6 function. A conditional knockout mouse line called Coro6tm1e(EUCOMM)Wtsi was generated at the Wellcome Trust Sanger Institute. Male and female animals underwent a standardized phenotypic screen to determine the effects of deletion. Additional screens performed:  - In-depth immunological phenotyping

References

External links